Arturo Mezzedimi (19 June 1922 – 30 May 2010) was an Italian architect who worked principally in Italian East Africa. He designed more than a hundred buildings in the Horn of Africa, among them Addis Ababa City Hall and Africa Hall, and planned more than twenty urban centres in Ethiopia. In 1965 he received the Mangia d'Oro prize of the city of Siena, and in 1972 was made a Grande Ufficiale of the Ordine al Merito della Repubblica Italiana.

References

20th-century Italian architects
1922 births
2010 deaths
Italian expatriates in Ethiopia